Vincent Paul Abbott  (March 11, 1964 – June 22, 2018) was an American musician best known for being the drummer and co-founder of the heavy metal band Pantera. He also co-founded Damageplan in 2003 with his younger brother, 'Dimebag' Darrell Abbott, and was a member of Hellyeah for 12 years from 2006 until his death in 2018.

Several rock media outlets have ranked Abbott as among the greatest metal drummers of all time.

Early years
Vincent Paul Abbott was born in Abilene, Texas, on March 11, 1964. His parents were Jerry, a country music songwriter and producer, and Carolyn Abbott. Abbott originally played the tuba but was directed towards the drums by his father, who said there were no career prospects for a tuba player. His father bought him his first drum kit.

Abbott cited Peter Criss, Alex Van Halen and Tommy Aldridge as his biggest influences as a drummer.

Career

Pantera

Abbott formed the heavy metal band Pantera in 1981 with his brother Darrell Abbott and Terry Glaze on guitars, bassist Tommy D. Bradford, and vocalist Donnie Hart. Upon Hart's departure, Terry Glaze assumed vocal duties. In the summer of 1982, Bradford left the band and was succeeded by Rex Brown. The band released three albums with that lineup.

Pantera recruited vocalist Phil Anselmo in 1987 and released Power Metal (album) in 1988. By 1990, the band had been signed to Atco Records and released Cowboys from Hell, which proved to be the band's turning point. Over the course of four more studio records, a live album and a greatest hits compilation, Anselmo and Pantera were nominated for four best metal performance Grammys for the songs "I'm Broken", "Suicide Note Pt. I", "Cemetery Gates", and "Revolution Is My Name".

In 2001, Anselmo decided to put Pantera on hold because of back pain while he toured and recorded with his side projects. Pantera's official disbandment took place in 2003 for several reasons, but mainly because of the ongoing dispute between Anselmo and the Abbott brothers, although Rex Brown remained neutral. In the years to follow, animosity would stir up between Abbott and Anselmo although  Anselmo had publicly announced that he wished for Abbott to forgive him and reform a friendship. However, Abbott stated that he was not interested in speaking to Anselmo.

Damageplan

After the breakup of Pantera, the Abbott brothers formed the heavy metal band Damageplan with former tattoo artist Bob Zilla on bass and former Halford guitarist Pat Lachman on lead vocals. Damageplan recorded one album, New Found Power, which was released on February 10, 2004. The song "Ashes to Ashes", a collaboration with Alice in Chains guitarist/vocalist Jerry Cantrell, was not completed in time to be featured on the album, but it was featured on the soundtrack to the 2004 film The Punisher, and was a bonus track on the Japanese version of New Found Power.

On December 8, 2004, while on tour to support Damageplan's album, Darrell was shot and killed along with three others by Nathan Gale at the Alrosa Villa in Columbus, Ohio. Damageplan disbanded shortly thereafter. In a 2016 interview with Loudwire, Abbott revealed that there are five unreleased Damageplan tracks that were meant for the band's second album that was set to be released in 2005, but that those tracks have no vocals, only him and Darrell playing on them. Abbott said that he didn't know what to do with those tracks, but he often thought about having some of Darrell's favorite singers like Rob Halford of Judas Priest and Chris Cornell of Soundgarden to record vocals for the songs, but he didn't have time to do it because he was focused on his band Hellyeah.

Hellyeah

After the death of Darrell, Abbott formed Big Vin Records in February 2006 and released Rebel Meets Rebel and a DVD, Dimevision, Volume 1. Abbott, along with Cristina Scabbia (co-lead vocalist of Lacuna Coil), wrote a monthly question-and-answer column in Revolver. Abbott maintained endorsement deals with ddrum, Sabian cymbals, and Vic Firth drumsticks. He previously endorsed Tama, Pearl drums, and Remo drumheads and hardware.

In June 2006, after an 18-month hiatus, Abbott was not sure if he would return to music, but eventually joined the heavy metal supergroup Hellyeah, which featured vocalist Chad Gray and guitarist Greg Tribbett from Mudvayne, guitarist Tom Maxwell from Nothingface, and bassist Bob Zilla from Damageplan, who was a replacement for original bassist Jerry Montano. Abbott recorded six studio albums with the band. In May 2019, it was announced that Hellyeah would tour for the first time since Abbott's death to support the final album he recorded with the band, Welcome Home. Stone Sour drummer Roy Mayorga was chosen as Abbott's replacement.

Collaborations
In November 2008, he handpicked several of his most memorable drum parts to demonstrate in a promotional video for the drum company ddrum: "Use My Third Arm", "Primal Concrete Sledge", "13 Steps to Nowhere", "Domination", and "Becoming".
In 2009, he started American Drummer Champions with the aide of friend and influence M. Ludowise, former Downset drummer.

In August 2013, Abbott was featured in a music video for Black Label Society's cover of "Ain't No Sunshine", appearing alongside a horse-masked Zakk Wylde. Wylde and Abbott were well known to be close friends, with Wylde also having been particularly close with Abbott's brother Darrell before his death in 2004.

For several years, Abbott had been trying to publish a cookbook called Drumming up an Appetite with Vinnie Paul.

Death
On June 22, 2018, Abbott died at his Las Vegas home at the age of 54. It was later revealed that Abbott had died from "dilated cardiomyopathy and coronary artery disease." News of his death was initially released on the official Pantera Facebook page, stating his association with the bands Pantera, Damageplan, and Hellyeah, along with a statement requesting that the privacy of his family be respected. Five days before his death, Abbott's final performance took place at The Vinyl at the Hard Rock Hotel and Resort in Las Vegas. 

Following his death, tributes from all over the metal community began pouring in, including members of Black Sabbath, Guns N' Roses, Metallica, Megadeth, Alice in Chains, Lamb of God, Periphery, Slipknot, the Acacia Strain, In Flames, and many others. He is buried beside his mother, Carolyn, and brother, Darrell, at Moore Memorial Gardens Cemetery in Arlington, Texas. In late 2020, a protective fence was installed around the Abbott burial ground in an effort to stop vandalism; Abbott remarked, following the defacing of his brother's grave, that the vandalism was "a real disrespectful thing".

Equipment

Abbott used Tama drums during the Cowboys from Hell album and tour from 1990 until 1992. On the Vulgar Display of Power and Far Beyond Driven albums and tours respectively, he used Remo drums. Abbott endorsed Remo until The Great Southern Trendkill, when he changed his endorsement to Pearl drums. He endorsed Pearl from 1996 until 2008, when he made his latest change to ddrum. Abbott used Sabian cymbals and Vic Firth drumsticks throughout his career. He was also known for using triggered samples mixed with live-miced drums during live shows. Starting in 2010, he used a ddrum Vinnie Paul signature series drum kit, with Evans drum heads, drum hardware, ddrum and Roland electronics, and Danmar red wood beaters and kick pads.

Discography

Pantera

Hellyeah

Damageplan
 New Found Power (2004)

David Allan Coe and Cowboys from Hell
 Rebel Meets Rebel (2006)

References

External links

 Official Pantera website

1964 births
2018 deaths
People from Abilene, Texas
Nu metal drummers
Thrash metal musicians
Pantera members
American heavy metal drummers
Musicians from Dallas
Hellyeah members
Damageplan members
20th-century American drummers
American male drummers
21st-century American drummers
Deaths from cardiomyopathy
Deaths from coronary artery disease